Stagecoach Midlands operates most bus routes in Northamptonshire and Warwickshire; the legal name for the company is Midland Red (South) Ltd.The company was previously split into Midland Red in Warwickshire and United Counties Omnibus in Northampton; however, the two were merged together under the Midland Red identity in 2021.

In towns, local bus routes are mostly operated under their own branding. These are Connect Kettering, Connect Wellingborough, Corby Star and Daventry Dart, while Northampton has no local name but is part of the Buzz fare scheme.

In December 2022, Stagecoach Midlands became a Transport for West Midlands contractor, taking on three former National Express West Midlands routes in Acocks Green, Chelmsley Wood, Kings Heath and Sutton Coldfield from 1 January 2023. The contract gain marks the first time the Stagecoach Group have operated regular bus services in Birmingham for many years.

Depots
 Corby (Station Road)
 Kettering (Northampton Road)
 Northampton (Main Road)
 Leamington Spa (Station Approach)
 Nuneaton (Newtown Road)
 Rugby (Railway Terrace)
 Stratford-upon-Avon (Avenue Farm)

Brands

Matrix

The Matrix brand was used by Stagecoach Midlands Nuneaton depot for routes 55, 56 and 57 between Coventry, Bedworth and Nuneaton from 2008 until 2015 when the brand was dropped due to the age of the fleet of MAN Enviro200s that sported this livery.

PrimeLine 48
PrimeLine 48 was the initial name given to the high frequency service 48 between Coventry and Nuneaton via Bedworth. The route has previously run with Dennis Dart vehicles and Alexander Dennis Enviro200s, until February 2018 when the service became a Stagecoach Gold route, running with long body Alexander Dennis Enviro200 MMCs.

The service operated at a frequency of every 10 minutes Coventry to Nuneaton, with alternate journeys continuing to either Atherstone or Leicester.

During summer 2020 the 48 service was split into 3 different routes:
48A for the Nuneaton to Atherstone service,
48C for the main Coventry to Nuneaton service,
48L for the Nuneaton to Leicester service

Goldline and Stagecoach Gold

In Warwick, the 'Goldline' service started on 12 November 2007, immediately after the buses were launched by Stagecoach Group chief executive Sir Brian Souter.

The service used a fleet of 11 Optare Solo SRs, on route 66 which was renumbered G1 following the introduction of Goldline. From mid-2015 this fleet of Optare Solos was displaced by 14 new Optare Solo SR vehicles, with a revised branding and livery to reflect the "Stagecoach Gold" brand name rather than the outdated "Goldline" name. It has since lost its Gold branding and is numbered service 1.

The route operated at a frequency of around every 10 minutes Monday to Saturday daytime and every half-hour on evenings and Sundays.  With effect from 2 November 2020, the service level was slightly reduced to every 12 minutes.

Services X46 and X47 also run as Stagecoach Gold services, running from Northampton to Wellingborough, Rushden, Higham Ferrers and Raunds. Buses did once extend further to Thrapston, though this part of the route was dropped due to low passenger numbers.

Connect Kettering

Connect Kettering  was the brand name of six bus routes in the town of Kettering in Northamptonshire, England. . Before Connect Kettering  all buses were part of Stagecoach and all buses had the Stagecoach livery prior to gaining this livery, they are now been repainted to the standard Stagecoach colors.

Connect Wellingborough

Connect Wellingborough is the brand name of eight bus routes in the town of Wellingborough in Northamptonshire, England. The buses are operated by Stagecoach and as of 21 October 2019 Grant Palmer. When the brand was established in 2006, the eight routes had new route numbers (which can be identified with 'W'), buses with new green colours, new bus stop signage, and later daily finishing times. Before Connect Wellingborough all buses were part of Stagecoach, all buses had the Stagecoach livery, and some routes finished at around 1500. There now exists no Connect Wellingborough name, and all local Wellingborough routes are now run by vehicles in standard Stagecoach livery.

Corby Star
Corby Star is the brand name for a bus service operated in the town of Corby in Northamptonshire, England. Services run to all estates in Corby, with opportunities to transfer to Stagecoach services bound for Milton Keynes, Peterborough and Kettering. As of 2018 however, Stagecoach Midlands Corby depot was reduced to being an outstation for local routes only, with the main operations for Corby running from the Kettering depot. The amount of Corby Star liveried vehicles has therefore decreased, though it is currently the only sub-brand kept by Stagecoach, with Connect Wellingborough, Connect Kettering and Daventry Dart no longer existing.

Daventry Dart

Daventry Dart was the name for six bus routes in and around Daventry, Northamptonshire, England. Most services under this brand ironically operated using Dennis Dart vehicles. The sub-brand has however since been dropped, with buses receiving only 'D' suffixed route numbers to indicate that they serve the Daventry area.

The X4

The X4 was formerly branded as "Cross Country", the longest bus route in Northamptonshire. using the same name as Stagecoach East route X5 which it once connected with at Milton Keynes. The X4 became a Stagecoach Gold route in 2011. However, as of July 2018, buses have stopped running between Northampton and Milton Keynes in favour of the X7 service from Leicester running this part of the route, replaced by X6 in July 2019.

References

External links
 Stagecoach Bus

Stagecoach Group bus operators in England